Damon Allen is an American former competitive figure skater who currently works as a coach and choreographer. He is the 1992 World Junior bronze medalist and a two-time Winter Universiade silver medalist. Allen currently coaches at the World Arena Ice Hall. In July 2014, he married Enrique Viveros in Santa Fe, New Mexico.

Results
GP: Champions Series (Grand Prix)

References

External links
 Broadmoor Skating Club and World Arena

American male single skaters
Living people
World Junior Figure Skating Championships medalists
LGBT figure skaters
Universiade medalists in figure skating
Year of birth missing (living people)
Universiade silver medalists for the United States
Competitors at the 1993 Winter Universiade
Competitors at the 1995 Winter Universiade
Gay sportsmen
21st-century LGBT people